Chanson d'amour (plural: Chansons d'amour) may refer to:

Chanson d'amour (musical)  1921 French adaptation of the operetta Das Dreimäderlhaus
"Chanson D'Amour", standard 1958 song by Wayne Shanklin, performed by Art and Dotty Todd, Manhattan Transfer 1977
"Chanson D'Amour", hit 1981 song by BZN written by Th. Tol, J. Tuijp, C. Tol

See also
Les Chansons d'amour; see Love Songs (2007 film)
Les plus belles chansons d'amour, a 2004 album by Celine Dion
grande chanson d'amour; see Grand chant